Luciano Bux (29 June 1936 – 8 August 2014) was a Roman Catholic bishop.

Born in Bari, he was ordained to the priesthood in 1961. Father Bux was appointed titular bishop of Aurusuliana, and auxiliary bishop of Bari-Bitonio in 1995.

In 2000, Bux was appointed Bishop of the Diocese of Oppido Mamertina-Palmi. Bux retired in 2011 on his 75th birthday, and died in 2014, aged 78.

Notes

1936 births
2014 deaths
Bishops in Calabria
People from Bari
Place of death missing
Disease-related deaths in Apulia